Waukegan National Airport  is a public airport in Waukegan, in Lake County, Illinois. It was originally Waukegan Memorial Airport. It has been operated by the Waukegan Port District since 1956 and is the second busiest airport in Illinois for international arrivals. In January 2014 under a FAA reclassification of many small airports, the airport was renamed Waukegan National Airport

The FAA's National Plan of Integrated Airport Systems for 2009–2013, categorized it as a reliever airport for Chicago O'Hare International Airport. Runway upgrades began in 2022.

During the 2020 Kenosha unrest, US President Donald Trump flew into Waukegan on his way to assess the damage in Kenosha, Wisconsin.

Facilities
Its two runways are asphalt surfaces over concrete pavements: runway 5/23 is 6,000 feet long and 150 feet wide (1,829 x 46 m) and runway 14/32 is 3,751 feet long and 75 feet wide (1,143 x 23 m).

In 2021, the airport announced a proposal to purchase 52 acres of land from the Lake County Forest Preserves to build a longer, extended runway parallel to runway 5/23. Though nothing would have been built on the land, the airport would have needed to remove some trees and swamp from the area for its required safety buffers. An environmental assessment and public hearings must be completed before the plan can move forward.

As of July 2018, there are 123 flights per day at UGN: 47% transient general aviation, 43% local general aviation, 8% air taxi, 2% military, and <1% commercial. There are 114 aircraft based at the field, including 74 single engine airplanes, 29 jets, 10 multiengine airplanes, and 1 helicopter.

Incidents and accidents 
The 2000 Zion mid-air collision, which occurred on February 8, 2000, involved the crash of two private aircraft that were trying to land at the airport.  The crash killed three and injured five, including broadcaster Bob Collins.
On November 14, 2006, a Czech Aircraft Works Sport Cruiser collided with the runway following a loss of control on takeoff from Waukegan. The aircraft drifted right after liftoff, and though the pilot applied left aileron and rudder, the airplane started "banking hard right." Though the pilot kept the nose up with left rudder, the aircraft lost altitude and turned steeper right despite even more left control input. The right wing then contacted the runway and the airplane came to rest after having completed a 360 degree turn. A magnetic block was later found lodged between the control stick and its mounting. The probable cause was found to be the pilot's failure to assure that all of his tools from work before the flight were accounted for prior to takeoff which resulted in the foreign object jamming the control stick and the pilot's inability to maintain control of the airplane.
On August 9, 2008, a Bellanca 17-30A Viking collided with construction material after a loss of directional control while landing at Waukegan. The pilot reported he applied toe brakes to turn off the runway onto Taxiway Bravo and discovered there was no pressure on the right brake. The pilot released the brakes as the pilot began to veer off the left side of the runway. The pilot then applied hard left brake to avoid hitting a construction worker off the side of the runway, at which point the aircraft turned left and contacted a taxiway light and concrete pillar. The pilot stated the brakes functioned properly up until the accident landing, and post-accident inspection of the airplane by an inspector from the FAA FSDO revealed there was no pressure in the right brake master cylinder. The probable cause was found to be the pilot's inability to maintain directional control of the airplane following a failure of the right brake.
On June 15, 2018, a Boeing B75 crashed while landing at Waukegan. While returning to the airport with a failed radio, during touchdown, the airplane "ballooned," touched down again, and then veered to the right and ground looped. The probable cause of the accident was found to be the flight instructor’s improper landing flare, which resulted in a bounced landing and subsequent loss of directional control.

References

External links 
 
 

 OpenNav airport charts for KUGN

Airports in Lake County, Illinois
Waukegan, Illinois